Steven D. Waldman is a pain management specialist, author and a pioneer in the sub-specialty of interventional pain management. He holds joint academic appointments as Professor of Anesthesiology and Professor of Medical Humanities and Bioethics at the University of Missouri–Kansas City School of Medicine where he currently serves as Vice Dean and Chairman of the Department of Medical Humanities and Bioethics.

Background
Waldman holds a Bachelor of Science degree in Geosciences from the University of Missouri–Kansas City, and was one of the first 100 students to be admitted in 1973 to its new medical school, the University of Missouri–Kansas City School of Medicine. He was elected a member of the Alpha Omega Alpha Honor Society and earned his MD in 1977. He completed his internship at Mayo Clinic in 1978 and did his residency in anesthesiology at the Mayo Graduate School of Medicine in Rochester, Minnesota where he also served as President of the Mayo Clinic Fellows Association.
 
Waldman received Masters in Business Administration In Healthcare Administration from City University in 1993 and his Juris Doctor from the University of Kansas School of Law in 1996.

Career
Waldman was one of the first pain management specialists in the region, founding pain clinics at numerous Kansas City area hospitals. Waldman is credited with coining the term interventional pain management to describe this new subspecialty of pain management that was focused on the use of interventional procedures to treat pain.
 
He holds joint academic appointments as Clinical Professor of Anesthesiology and Professor of Medical Humanities and Bioethics at the University of Missouri–Kansas City School of Medicine. He serves as the Inaugural Chairman of the Department of Medical Humanities and Bioethics and a member of the Humanities Advisory Committee in the School of Medicine. He is a founding member of the Sirridge Office of Medical Humanities and Bioethics, helping raise the initial funding for the William Sirridge lectureship, and he is on the advisory board of the Sirridge Office.
 
Waldman currently serves as Vice Dean at the UMKC School of Medicine. He is a Committee Chair of the Academy of Professionalism in Healthcare as well as the President of the Osler Society of Greater Kansas City.

Publications
He is the author of more than twenty-five textbooks and numerous academic articles on pain management.

Select bibliography

 
 
 
 
 
 
 
 
 

He contributed the "Pain practice management" subsection to the book Operating room leadership and management. Waldman's Atlas of Common Pain Syndromes has been translated into Spanish, Italian and Polish.

Awards and recognition
Waldman was Mayo Clinic Fellows Association President and has been the recipient of several accolades and awards:
 
 Alpha Omega Alpha Honor Society
 UMKC Alumni Achievement Award for service to the University and School of Medicine.
 UMKC Medical Humanities Award in recognition of his role in helping found the Sirridge Office of Medical Humanities and Bioethics at the UMKC School of Medicine and his teaching efforts in this area.
 UMKC Legacy Award (as a member of the Waldman family)
 UMKC School of Medicine Humanities Award
 UMKC Alumni Achievement Award
 Society For Pain Practice Management Distinguished Service Award

References

External links
 Facebook profile

1951 births
Living people
Physicians from Kansas
American anesthesiologists
University of Missouri–Kansas City faculty
University of Missouri–Kansas City alumni
American pain physicians